8HA is a radio station based in Alice Springs, Northern Territory, Australia. It broadcasts on the medium wave radio band, at a frequency of 900 kHz.

It also broadcasts on radio channel 42 on the Optus Aurora satellite service on Optus C1.

8HA has been on the air since 2 March 1971, and is the only commercial radio station operating on the medium-wave (i.e. AM) band in the Northern Territory (the only other station to do so, 8DN in Darwin, was shut down in the 1990s).

The current format is a mixture of talk and music, with the positioning statement "The Best Songs Of All Time."

Announcers
 Dave Peters (The Big Breakfast)
 Sandee Beech (The Big Breakfast)
 John Laws (Mornings)
 Mel Elliot (AM News)
 Adrian Renzie (Central Australia Today)
 Brent Bultitude (Afternoons)
 Dave Prior (Drive)
 Cameron Jackson (PM News)
 Graeme Gilbert (Talk Tonight)
 Gary Stewart (Talk Overnight)

Networked Shows
Various shows are sourced from other Australian radio stations including  
A-League Nation, NRL Nation and Super Rugby Nation on (Friday, Saturday and Sunday afternoons / evenings / nights).

Notes

Radio stations in Alice Springs
Radio stations in the Northern Territory